Pericycos teragramus is a species of beetle in the family Cerambycidae. It was described by Gilmour in 1950. It is known from Borneo and Malaysia.

References

Lamiini
Beetles described in 1950